Kenneth McArthur may refer to:

 Ken McArthur (1881–1960), track and field athlete
 Kenneth A. McArthur (born 1950), known as Ken McArthur, American author and entrepreneur